The 2001–02 Liga Alef season saw Hapoel Kafr Sumei (champions of the North Division) and Maccabi Ramat Amidar (champions of the South Division) winning the title and promotion to Liga Artzit.

At the bottom, Tzeirei Nahf, Hapoel Hurfeish (from North division), Hapoel Kiryat Ono, Hapoel Lod and Maccabi Ma'ale Adumim (from South division) were all automatically relegated to Liga Bet.

North Division

South Division

References
Liga Alef North, 01-02 One 
Liga Alef South, 01-02 One 

Liga Alef seasons
4
Israel